Gurinder Singh Dhillon, also known as Baba Ji to his followers, is the spiritual head of Radha Soami Satsang Beas (RSSB). He succeeded Maharaj Charan Singh, his uncle, in 1990. The headquarters of this spiritual community, called Dera Baba Jaimal Singh, are located beside the river Beas near the town of Beas, Punjab, in northern India, and have been a centre for Satsang since 1891. RSSB has centres located worldwide.

Biography
Gurinder Singh was born 1 August 1954, into a family of the Dhillon clan who were followers of the Radha Soami Satsang Beas. His parents were Gurmukh Singh Dhillon and Mahinder Kaur.

He was educated at the Lawrence School, Sanawar, in the Shimla Hills of Himachal Pradesh, and obtained his bachelor's degree in Commerce from Panjab University, Chandigarh. He was in Spain working before coming back to India to accept his nomination as the next spiritual head of RSSB in 1990. He has two sons, namely Gurpreet Singh Dhillon and Gurkirat Singh Dhillon. Gurpreet Singh Dhillon is the CEO of Religare Health Trust (RHT).

Spiritual discourses
The Dera, located in Beas, Punjab, is the designated home of the spiritual leader of the organization. Large crowds visit on designated days, usually on the weekends, to hear discourses from him. He also gives Satsang at other major centres of RSSB in India. He goes on tour to the various RSSB centres outside of India during the months of April–August.

References

External links
Radha Soami Satsang Beas
Science of the Soul Research Centre

Surat Shabd Yoga
Sant Mat gurus
Lawrence School, Sanawar alumni
Living people
1954 births